Hold to a Dream is the eighth album by the progressive bluegrass band New Grass Revival, released in 1987. The lead-off single "Unconditional Love" reached number 44 on the Billboard Hot Country Singles & Tracks chart. In 1988, "Can't Stop Now" reached number 45.

Hold to a Dream was remastered and reissued on CD, on February 20, 2001 on the Southern Music label.

Track listing
"Hold to a Dream" (Tim O'Brien) – 3:38
"One Way Street" (O'Brien) – 2:50
"Can't Stop Now" (Gary Nicholson, Wendy Waldman) – 4:01
"I'll Take Tomorrow" (Pat Flynn) – 2:56
"Before the Heartache Rolls In" (Radney Foster, Bill Lloyd) – 5:23
"Looking Past You" (Flynn) – 2:57
"How About You" (Jesse Winchester) – 4:26
"Metric Lips" (Béla Fleck) – 4:37
"I Can Talk to You" (Flynn) – 3:22
"Unconditional Love" (Don Cook, Nicholson) – 3:21

Personnel
Sam Bush - guitar, mandolin, fiddle, vocals
Pat Flynn - guitar, vocals
Béla Fleck - banjo, vocals 
John Cowan - vocals, bass
Additional musicians:
Eddie Bayers – drums
Bob Mater – drums
Tom Roady – percussion

Production notes
Garth Fundis – producer
Denny Purcell – mastering
Bil VornDick – engineer
Caroline Greyshock – photography
Henry Marquez – art direction

1987 albums
New Grass Revival albums
Albums produced by Garth Fundis
Capitol Records albums